Angela Villela Olinto (born July 19, 1961) is an astroparticle physicist and professor at the University of Chicago as well as the dean of the Physical Sciences. Her work is focused on understanding the origin of high-energy cosmic rays, gamma rays, and neutrinos.

Childhood and education 
Olinto was born in Boston, Massachusetts, during her father's graduate studies at the Massachusetts Institute of Technology. The family moved back to Rio de Janeiro, Brazil, when she was a toddler. She lived in Rio and Brasilia and received her bachelor's degree in physics from Pontificia Universidade Catolica in 1981. As she was finishing her undergraduate studies, she became ill with what was later diagnosed as polymyositis. She returned to MIT and received her Ph.D. in physics in 1987.

Career 
After her Ph.D., Olinto joined the Fermilab Theoretical Astrophysics Group as a postdoc. From Fermilab, Olinto moved to the University of Chicago where she became the first woman to serve as a professor in the Department of Astronomy and Astrophysics. Starting in 1996, she also began a joint appointment with the Enrico Fermi Institute. She served as chair of the Department of Astronomy and Astrophysics from 2003-2006 and again from 2012-2017. In 2006, she received the Chair d’ Excellence Award from the Agence Nationale de la Recherche and served as visiting professor in the Laboratoire d’AstroParticule et Cosmologie (APC). In 2017, Olinto was named the Albert A. Michelson Distinguished Service Professor in the Department of Astronomy and Astrophysics. In 2018, she became the first female dean of the Physical Sciences Division at the University of Chicago. Olinto has given over 500 lectures worldwide and published over 250 papers.

Research 
Throughout Olinto's career, she has made theoretical and experimental contributions to astroparticle physics, including contributions to the study of the structure of neutron stars, inflationary theory, the origin and evolution of cosmic magnetic fields, the nature of dark matter, and the origin of the highest energy cosmic particles: cosmic rays, gamma-rays, and neutrinos.

Olinto emerged as a leader of the science behind the 3,000 km2 Pierre Auger Observatory in Malargue, Argentina, built and operated by a 19-country collaboration. Her group pioneered in depth studies of the physics and astrophysics of ultra-high energy cosmic ray (UHECR) including the propagation and neutrino production of UHE nuclei and acceleration models based on newborn pulsars.

Starting in 2012, Olinto served as the United States principal investigator of JEM-EUSO (Extreme Universe Space Observatory on-board of the Japanese Experiment Module of the International Space Station) mission—an international collaboration involving 16 countries to discover the origin of the highest energy cosmic rays.

Olinto is the principal investigator of EUSO-SPB (Extreme Universe Space Observatory on a Super Pressure Balloon), a series of NASA balloon missions. EUSO-SPB1 flew in April 2017 and EUSO-SPB2 is now under construction. EUSO-SPB2 will combine the fluorescence technique developed for JEM-EUSO and EUSO-SPB1 with a novel Cherenkov detector designed to search for up-going tau showers produced by astrophysical tau neutrinos. EUSO-SPB2 is expected to fly by 2022.

Starting in 2017, Olinto served as principal investigator for POEMMA (Probe of Extreme Multi-Messenger Astrophysics), providing the conceptual design for the NASA space mission. The study will be presented to the Astronomy and Astrophysics 2020 Decadal Survey.

Awards and honors 

 Elected to the National Academy of Sciences in 2021.
 Elected to the American Academy of Arts and Sciences in 2021.
 Elected to the Academia Brasileira de Ciencias in 2021.
 Albert A. Michelson Distinguished Service Professor in the Department of Astronomy and Astrophysics and the College, The University of Chicago. (2017)
 Faculty Award for Excellence in Graduate Teaching and Mentoring, The University of Chicago. (2014-2015)
 Homer J. Livingston Professor in the Department of Astronomy and Astrophysics and the College, The University of Chicago. (2013–2016)
 Hess Lecturer of the 33rd International Cosmic Ray Conference. (2013)
 Elected Fellow of the American Association for the Advancement of Science. (2012)
 Awarded the Llewellyn John and Harriet Manchester Quantrell Award for Excellence in Undergraduate Teaching, The University of Chicago (2011)
 Awarded Chaire d’Excellence of the French Agence Nationale de la Recherche. (2006)
 Speaker Award of the Particles and Nuclei International Conference (PANIC 05). (2005)
 Convocation Speaker for the 478th Convocation at the University of Chicago. (2004)
 Elected Fellow of the American Physical Society. (2001)
 Awarded the Arthur H. Compton Lecturer, Enrico Fermi Institute, The University of Chicago. (1991)

Personal life 
Olinto is married to classical guitarist Sérgio Assad.

References 

Astroparticle physics
University of Chicago faculty
Fermilab
1961 births
Pontifical Catholic University of Rio de Janeiro alumni
People from Boston
Fellows of the American Physical Society
21st-century American physicists
Brazilian physicists
American women physicists
Living people
MIT Center for Theoretical Physics alumni
American women academics
Members of the United States National Academy of Sciences
21st-century American women scientists